The president of the United States is the head of state and head of government of the United States, indirectly elected to a four-year term via the Electoral College. The officeholder leads the executive branch of the federal government and is the commander-in-chief of the United States Armed Forces. Since the office was established in 1789, 45 men have served in 46 presidencies. The first president, George Washington, won a unanimous vote of the Electoral College; one, Grover Cleveland, served two non-consecutive terms and is therefore counted as the 22nd and 24th president of the United States, giving rise to the discrepancy between the number of presidencies and the number of persons who have served as president. The incumbent president is Joe Biden.

The presidency of William Henry Harrison, who died 31 days after taking office in 1841, was the shortest in American history. Franklin D. Roosevelt served the longest, over twelve years, before dying early in his fourth term in 1945. He is the only U.S. president to have served more than two terms. Since the ratification of the Twenty-second Amendment to the United States Constitution in 1951, no person may be elected president more than twice, and no one who has served more than two years of a term to which someone else was elected may be elected more than once.

Four presidents died in office of natural causes (William Henry Harrison, Zachary Taylor, Warren G. Harding, and Franklin D. Roosevelt), four were assassinated (Abraham Lincoln, James A. Garfield, William McKinley and John F. Kennedy), and one resigned (Richard Nixon, facing impeachment). John Tyler was the first vice president to assume the presidency during a presidential term, and set the precedent that a vice president who does so becomes the fully functioning president with his presidency.

Throughout most of its history, American politics has been dominated by political parties. The Constitution is silent on the issue of political parties, and at the time it came into force in 1789, no organized parties existed. Soon after the 1st Congress convened, political factions began rallying around dominant Washington administration officials, such as Alexander Hamilton and Thomas Jefferson. Concerned about the capacity of political parties to destroy the fragile unity holding the nation together, Washington remained unaffiliated with any political faction or party throughout his eight-year presidency. He was, and remains, the only U.S. president never affiliated with a political party.

Presidents

See also 
 Acting President of the United States
 Founding Fathers of the United States
 President of the Continental Congress

Notes

References

Works cited 

General
 
 
 

Expert studies
 
 
 
 
 
 
 
 
 
 
 
 
 
 
 
 
 

Presidential biographies
 
 
 
 
 
 
 
 
 
 
 
 
 
 
 
 
 
 
 
 
 
 
 
 
 
 
 
 
 
 
 
 
 
 
 
 
 
 
 
 
 
 
 
 
 
 

Online sources

External links 
 
 

United States